Old Mother Riley's New Venture is a low-budget black-and-white 1949 British comedy film, starring Arthur Lucan, Kitty McShane and Chili Bouchier. It is the twelfth in the long-running Old Mother Riley films, and was the first of the series to play in London's West End. In addition, it was the first to be released in the US, where it opened in 1952, as Old Mother Riley, (and was re-released there as A Wild Irish Night).

Plot summary
The owner of a five star London hotel leaves for a holiday, and to everyone's surprise promotes Old Mother Riley from kitchen dishwasher to manageress. Chaos ensues, and Mother Riley and Kitty are suddenly suspects in the theft of the Royal Hula Diamond, but somehow along the way also manage a trip to a beauty parlour, a banquet with Arab royalty, some Saint Patrick's Day celebrations, and a climactic custard pie fight.

Cast
 Arthur Lucan as Old Mother Riley
 Kitty McShane as Kitty Riley
 Chili Bouchier as Cora Gayne
 Willer Neal as David Thompson
 Sebastian Cabot as Potentate
 Wilfred Babbage as Major Gayne
 Maureen Riscoe as Mabel
 Fred Groves as John Grigsby
 C. Denier Warren as Matthew Hillick
 Paul Sheridan as Saunders
 Arthur Gomez as Chef
 John Le Mesurier as Karl
 Amando Guinle as Jules
 Grace Arnold as Prison Governor
 Howard Douglas as Dr Collins
 Hugh Dempster as Drunk
 Gordon Littman as 1st Aide
 Robert Moore as Allan
 George Street as Walters
 James Knight as Police Superintendent
 Blanche Fothergill as Mrs Ginochie
 Brian Royceton as Commissionaire
 Pamela Skiff as Beauty Parlour Attendant
 Joy Frankau as Beauty Parlour Attendant

Critical reception
The Digital Fix wrote, "New Venture is essentially unwatchable...Old routines, a bare minimum of laughs and a comic pairing who are, quite frankly, way beyond their best."
At the time of the film's release, Monthly Film Bulletin called the film, "a vivacious slapsick comedy."
On its U.S. release, Variety wrote of the film, "offers little appeal for most situations...Film's best market appears to lie in "Irish Night" shows or in neighbourhoods where there's a sizable Irish population. Cast is unknown to American audiences... Arthur Lucan has a thespian field day in the title role."

References

External links
 
 

1949 films
1949 comedy films
British comedy films
Films directed by John Harlow
Films set in hotels
Films set in London
British black-and-white films
1940s English-language films
1940s British films